Johan Frithiof Isidor "John" Svanberg (1 May 1881 – 11 September 1957) was a Swedish runner. He competed in the 5 miles and marathon at the 1906 Intercalated Games and 1908 Summer Olympics and won two silver and one bronze medals. In 1908 he set a world record over 3000 m that stood until 1911.

After the 1908 Olympics Svanberg was deprived of his amateur status for some commercial activities. He moved to the United States, where he worked as a painter and continued competing in running. He died in New York in 1957.

References

1881 births
1957 deaths
Swedish male middle-distance runners
Swedish male long-distance runners
Olympic silver medalists for Sweden
Olympic bronze medalists for Sweden
Athletes (track and field) at the 1906 Intercalated Games
Athletes (track and field) at the 1908 Summer Olympics
Olympic athletes of Sweden
World record setters in athletics (track and field)
Medalists at the 1908 Summer Olympics
Medalists at the 1906 Intercalated Games
Olympic silver medalists in athletics (track and field)
Olympic bronze medalists in athletics (track and field)
Athletes from Stockholm